John P. Lynn was a Chicago businessman. 

After serving in France during World War I, Lynn returned to Chicago.  Around 1920, he was one of the founders of the Autopoint Company. He helped pioneer the use of plastics to make mechanical pencils.  Around 1925, Lynn sold his holdings in Autopoint to the Bakelite Corporation.  Shortly after that he was one of the founders of  the Dur-O-Lite Pencil Company.    Lynn was associated with Dur-O-Lite for many years. 

Over the years obtained many patents for mechanical pencils and pencil manufacturing processes.

American businesspeople